The 2008–09 Primera División season (officially the 2008–09 Copa CANTV for sponsorship reasons) is the 27th professional season of Venezuela's top-flight football league.

Teams

 Aragua
 Carabobo
 Caracas
 Deportivo Anzoátegui
 Deportivo Italia
 Deportivo Táchira
 El Vigía
 Estrella Roja
 Estudiantes
 Guaros FC
 Llaneros
 Mineros
 Minervén
 Monagas
 Portuguesa
 Unión Atlético Maracaibo
 Zamora
 Zulia

Torneo Apertura

Standings

Results

Torneo Clausura

Standings

Results

Aggregate table

Top goalscorers

Serie Final
Caracas F.C. and Deportivo Italia ended with one championship each at the end of the Apertura and Clausura. Tournament rules establish that a playoff game is required. Caracas F.C. won by an aggregate score of 6-1.

See also
2008–09 in Venezuelan football

References

External links
FVF's official website 

Football
2008-09
Ven
Ven